Raffaele Mattioli (1775 - after 1831) was an Italian painter, active in his native Naples.

He trained under Vincenzo Pastore, and was given a stipend to study in Rome. He returned to paint Oath of the Romans before the Law and Death of Hector for Lord Bristol. He became a Professor in the painting of figures at the Academy of Fine Arts in Naples. He was also used for the painted decoration of figures in the Teatro San Carlo.

References

1775 births
Year of death missing
18th-century Italian painters
Italian male painters
19th-century Italian painters
Painters from Naples
Italian scenic designers
19th-century Italian male artists
18th-century Italian male artists